The 1954 Maryland gubernatorial election was held on November 2, 1954. Incumbent Republican Theodore McKeldin defeated Democratic nominee Curley Byrd with 54.46% of the vote.

This was the first time that a Republican was re-elected to a second consecutive term as governor of Maryland, and this would not occur again until 2018 when Larry Hogan won re-election.

Primary elections
Primary elections were held on June 28, 1954.

Democratic primary

Candidates
Curley Byrd, former President of the University of Maryland
George P. Mahoney, perennial candidate

Results

General election

Candidates
Theodore McKeldin, Republican 
Curley Byrd, Democratic

Results

References

1954
Maryland
Gubernatorial
November 1954 events in the United States